Sonder Design is an Australian design studio with its headquarters in Sydney at the Australian Technology Park. They designed the Sonder keyboard, a dynamic E Ink keyboard.

The company has offices in Sydney, Shenzhen and Taipei. Sonder uses a transparent patented mechanism above a display which can dynamically change to adapt to the keyboard layout in use or to show the function of the key.

Overview 
The production model uses a single E ink display from E Ink Holdings. The design featured on the design studio's website received attention on the web when it was featured on Wired in July 2015, as well as other technology websites.

The Sonder keyboard allows for greater user interaction, by dynamically displaying the current function of the keys. For example, when the user presses the shift key, the pictures would change to upper-case versions. It would also make switching between different keyboard layouts (such as English and Cyrillic) rapid, and could make the switch to alternative layouts such as Dvorak easier for people who only have a QWERTY keyboard with no possibility of rearranging the keys.

Apple acquisition rumors  
According to a report by the Guardian  and the Wall Street Journal, Apple had approached the startup for acquisition with the assistance of Foxconn. Sonder issued a press release stating Serra-Martins did not meet on Cook in Shenzhen, China on October 26, 2016, as reported. Members of Sonder's sales and Macbook architecture team are Apple alumni.

Production schedule 
Initial reports indicated that the keyboards will start shipping during 2017. The keyboard is being manufactured by Foxconn.

Acquisition by Foxconn 
Reports indicate that Sonder was acquired by strategic partner Foxconn International Holdings in late 2019.

Similar keyboards 
The patent for this "Display Keyboard" (U.S. Patent 5,818,361)[12] has expired. However, the first programmable LCD keyboard [13] was developed in the mid-1980s in Germany. This keyboard, sold under the LCBoard name in the U.S. until 1999, contained many of the features of the Optimus keyboard including monochrome graphic icons on each keyboard key, macro programming, context sensitive and application dependent switching between functions. S. Bigbie et al. published related ideas in an IBM Technical Disclosure Bulletin (Vol. 21 No. 2 July 1978), as did Alan Bagley of Hewlett-Packard in (U.S. Patent 4,078,257).

A concept design using E Ink technology was created  by Maxim Mezentsev and Aleksander Suhih in 2013.

A patent application filed on 13 March 2007 suggests that Apple Inc. may be working on a similar dynamically changeable organic light-emitting diode (OLED) keyboard.

References

External links 
 Sonder Design - website of the company

Computer peripherals
Computer companies of Australia
Electronics companies of Australia
Computer keyboard companies
Design companies of Australia